Callisthene is a genus of flowering plants belonging to the family Vochysiaceae.

Its native range is Brazil, Bolivia, Paraguay.

Species:

Callisthene dryadum 
Callisthene erythroclada 
Callisthene fasciculata 
Callisthene inundata 
Callisthene major 
Callisthene microphylla 
Callisthene minor 
Callisthene mollissima

References

Vochysiaceae
Myrtales genera